Abhaya Indrayan (born 11 November 1945) is an Indian professor and researcher of Biostatistics. He had worked with different organizations and universities, including Delhi University College of Medical Sciences and the World Health Organization.

Abhaya resides in Delhi NCR, India after his retirement. He is married and has two children.

Early life and education 
Abhaya Indrayan was born on 11 November 1945, in Meerut, India. He was born during the time that India was fighting for its freedom from the British rule. That was the reason why his father, who was a freedom fighter, was jailed repeatedly for long periods.

Abhaya took his early education in Meerut from N.A.S. Inter. College and Meerut College. In 1977, he received his master's degree and Doctoral degree from Ohio State University in Columbus, Ohio, USA.

Career 
Abhaya Indrayan was the founding Professor and Head of the Department of Biostatistics and Medical Informatics in Delhi University College of Medical Sciences. In 1995, his department was set up as an independent division, and was upgraded to a full department in 2005.

During his tenure in the college since 1979, he had been the Sports Adviser, Coordinator of Medical Education Unit, Chairman Computer Committee, Convenor Souvenir Committee, Incharge Annual Reports and held several other important assignments. He also taught online courses for the students of Institute of Statistics Education in Arlington County, Virginia.

He has more than 200 publications to his credit, including the books Medical Biostatistics and Concise Encyclopedia of Biostatistics for Medical Professionals. A partial list of his publications appears at the website of Indian Academy of Sciences. Among his other significant works are: smoking index at Collection of Biostatistics Research Archive of Berkeley Electronic Press, which is among the top 5 downloads; and estimates and projections of cardiovascular and diabetes cases in India, which are quoted in the Government of India's official estimates at National Health Profile.

He stayed in the institution until retiring in 2010, wherein he attained the age of 65.

Achievements 
Abhaya Indrayan collaborated with the World Health Organization for several projects including National Burden of Disease Studies: a Practical Guide, Teaching Health Statistics, and 11 Health Questions about the 11 SEAR Countries, and served as Temporary Adviser to their Bi-Regional Consultation. He was a technical editor of their biregional report Health in Asia and the Pacific and participated in their debate on Health Systems Performance Assessment. He has completed 32 assignments for the World Health Organization, 3 for the World Bank, 3 for UNAIDS and 2 for Danish Assistance to the National Program for Prevention and Control of Blindness. He has proposed Statistical Medicine  as a new emerging medical specialty.

Honors and awards 
 Elected Fellow of the Indian Academy of Sciences (2011).
 Fellow of the Royal Statistical Society. (2002)
 Elected Fellow of the National Academy of Medical Sciences (India) – a rare distinction for a non-medical scientist to be so honoured at that time (1998)
 Elected Fellow of the Indian Society for Medical Statistics (1996)
 WHO Fellow and Visiting Research Scientist at the University of Massachusetts, Amherst, MA (1995)
 Convenor, Special Interest Group on Medical Informatics, Computer Society of India (1994–1999).
 Chairman, Silver Jubilee Committee, Indian Society for Medical Statistics (2008–2011)
 President-Elect of the Indian Society for Medical Statistics (2012–2014)
 President, Indian Society for Medical Statistics, 2015

Bibliography

References 

1945 births
Living people
Biostatisticians
Indian medical writers
Ohio State University alumni
Fellows of the National Academy of Medical Sciences
People from Meerut
Scientists from Uttar Pradesh